In the United Kingdom, there are many 'local authority maintained' (i.e. state funded) Roman Catholic schools. These are theoretically open to pupils of all faiths or none, although if the school is over-subscribed priority will be given to Roman Catholic children.

History
During the Reformation, Catholic schools were created on the European continent for the training of children of Catholic families from Britain. During the 18th century, colleges for the training of priests were created in Scotland, such as in Scalan and Lismore Seminary. After the Re-establishment of the English hierarchy and the Scottish hierarchy new schools were created. After the Education Act 1918 in Scotland and the Education Act 1944 in England and Wales, state-funded Catholic schools were built. Nevertheless, today there has been some controversy over Roman Catholic schools. Some Labour backbenchers would like to see them closed along with all other faith-based schools, and this was the official policy of the Scottish Green Party at the 2007 Scottish Parliament election. Some local authorities – such as in Lanarkshire – have chosen to build so-called "shared campuses" where a Roman Catholic and non-denominational school share grounds, a building, and facilities such as canteen, sport halls etc., but lessons are taught separately. This policy has had mixed success – although supporters say it reduces the risk of "us and them" sectarianism, some shared campuses have suffered disruptions on opening. At one stage the Scottish Catholic Church even considered legal action against North Lanarkshire Council to stop another "shared campus" being built.

The Catholic Education Service provides the central co-ordination under the Bishops' Conference for Catholic schools in England and Wales.

In Northern Ireland, Roman Catholic schools are state-funded and organised and run by the Council for Catholic Maintained Schools (CCMS).

Scotland
After the Education Act 1918, many state-funded Scottish Catholic schools were started. Nevertheless, there exist Catholic independent schools such as St Aloysius' College, Glasgow, Fernhill School, Rutherglen, and Kilgraston School. During the Scottish Reformation, while there were no Catholic seminaries in England and Wales, there was a number of Scottish seminaries before the restoration of the Scottish Catholic hierarchy. Notable Scottish Catholic schools today include:

Aberdeen
 St Peter's Roman Catholic Primary School, Aberdeen

Dumfries and Galloway
 St Joseph's College, Dumfries

Dundee
 St John's Roman Catholic High School
 St Paul's Roman Catholic Academy

East Ayrshire
 Saint Joseph's Academy, Kilmarnock

East Dunbartonshire
 St Ninian's High School, Kirkintilloch
 Turnbull High School

East Renfrewshire
 St Luke's High School
 St Ninian's High School, Giffnock

Edinburgh
 Holy Rood High School, Edinburgh
 St Augustine's High School, Edinburgh
 St Thomas of Aquin's High School

Fife
 St Columba's Roman Catholic High School, Dunfermline

Glasgow
 All Saints Roman Catholic Secondary School
 Cardinal Winning Secondary School
 Holyrood Secondary School
 John Paul Academy
 Lourdes Secondary School
 Notre Dame High School, Glasgow
 St Aloysius' College, Glasgow
 St Andrew's Secondary School, Glasgow
 St Margaret Mary's Secondary School
 St Mungo's Academy
 St Paul's High School, Glasgow
 St Roch's Secondary School
 St Thomas Aquinas Secondary School, Glasgow

Inverclyde
 St Columba's High School, Gourock

Midlothian
 St David's Roman Catholic High School

North Ayrshire
 St Matthew's Academy

North Lanarkshire
 Cardinal Newman High School, Bellshill
 Our Lady's High School, Cumbernauld
 Our Lady's High School, Motherwell
 St Aidan's High School
 St. Maurice's High School
 Taylor High School, New Stevenston

Perth and Kinross
 Kilgraston School
 St John's Academy

Renfrewshire
 St Andrew's Academy, Paisley
 St Benedict's Roman Catholic High School
 Trinity High School, Renfrew

South Ayrshire
 Queen Margaret Academy

South Lanarkshire
 Fernhill School, Rutherglen
 Holy Cross High School, Hamilton
 St Andrew's and St Bride's High School
 Saint John Ogilve High School
 Trinity High School, Rutherglen

Stirling
 St Modan's High School

West Dunbartonshire
 Our Lady and St Patrick's High School
 St Peter the Apostle High School

West Lothian
 St Margaret's Academy
 St Kentigern's Academy

See also
Catholic Church in England and Wales
Catholic Church in Scotland
Catholic Church in Northern Ireland
Selective Catholic schools

References

 
Religious education in the United Kingdom